The Great Flood of 1844 is the biggest flood ever recorded on the Missouri River and Upper Mississippi River, in North America, in terms of discharge. The adjusted economic impact was not as great as subsequent floods because of the small population in the region at the time.  The flood devastation was particularly widespread since the region had few levees at the time, so the waters were able to spread far from the normal banks. Among the hardest hit in terms of mortality were the Wyandot Indians, who lost 100 people in the diseases that occurred after the flood in the vicinity of today's Kansas City, Kansas.

The flood formed a large sandbar in front of the Wayne City Landing at Independence, Missouri, which caused settlers to go further west to Westport Landing in Kansas City, which resulted in significant local economic and cultural impact. Independence had been the trailhead for several key emigrant trails, prior to 1846 notably both the Santa Fe Trail and one alternative eastern starting branch of the Oregon Trail. After the Mexican–American War treaty of 1848, the Oregon Trail's trailhead became a trailhead of the California Trail and an alternative beginning for the Mormon Trail.

In 1850, the United States Congress passed the Swamp Land Act providing land grants to build stronger levees.

The flood is the highest recorded for the Mississippi River at St. Louis.

Comparison to other big floods in Kansas City 

Channelling and levee construction have altered how the floods have hit various areas along the Missouri River.  Here's a comparison of the four big floods since the early 19th century.

Flood of 1851 — While the Great Flood of 1851 was most severe in Iowa, it also affected the Missouri and Mississippi river basins. In St. Louis, Missouri, on June 11, 1851, floodwaters rose to within  of the 1844 flood, while at Cape Girardeau, Missouri, the flooding was worse than in 1844.
The 1951 crest on July 14, 1951, was almost  lower than the 1844 flood and three feet lower than the 1993 flood. However, the flood was the most devastating of all modern floods for Kansas City since its levee system was not built to withstand it. It destroyed the city's stockyards and forced the building of an airport away from the Missouri River bottoms.
While the 1993 flood had devastating impacts elsewhere, Kansas City survived it relatively well because of levee improvements after the 1951 flood.

See also
Floods in the United States

References

UMKC history
Wyandot history
Coopers Landing history
USGS History

Natural disasters in Missouri
Missouri River floods
Kansas City metropolitan area
1844 floods in the United States 
1851 floods in the United States 
1951 floods in the United States 
1993 floods in the United States 
1844 in North America
1844 in the United States
1844 natural disasters in the United States
1844 in Missouri